Starship: The Game of Space Contact is a 1975 board wargame published by Fantasy Games Unlimited.

Gameplay
Starship is two-player game in which each player controls one starship in a situation governed by one of four different scenario orders with goals kept secret from the opponent.  One player is the Interceptor and the other is the Intruder, and mission orders range from peaceful contact to total destruction of the opposing vessel.

Reception
Tony Watson reviewed Starship in The Space Gamer No. 8. He commented that "Starship" is fast paced and plays well. The emphasis is on skill and bluff, outmanuver and good planning rather than luck and certainly one of the better science fiction tactical systems around."

External Links

References

Board games introduced in 1975
Fantasy Games Unlimited games